Peter Bourke (born 23 April 1958) is an Australian former middle-distance runner.

He is best known for winning the 800 metres at the 1982 Commonwealth Games in Brisbane.

External links 
 
 Peter Bourke at Australian Athletics Historical Results

Australian male middle-distance runners
Athletes (track and field) at the 1982 Commonwealth Games
Athletes (track and field) at the 1986 Commonwealth Games
Commonwealth Games gold medallists for Australia
Commonwealth Games medallists in athletics
1958 births
Living people
Medallists at the 1982 Commonwealth Games
20th-century Australian people